The World Confessional Lutheran Association was established in 1965 by a group of pastors and lay people who were concerned about trends in the American Lutheran Church and other synods which were contrary to what they believed were the historical beliefs and practice of Lutheranism.

In 1980 through the involvement of Lutherans Alert National the group was renamed Conservative Lutheran Association (CLA).. It has 994 baptized members and is a member of the National Association of Evangelicals.

References

Lutheran denominations in North America